Gould Peak is a peak standing  north of Tennant Peak in the southern group of the Rockefeller Mountains, on Edward VII Peninsula in Marie Byrd Land, Antarctica. It was discovered by the Byrd Antarctic Expedition in 1929, and named by Richard E. Byrd for Charles ("Chips") Gould, a carpenter on the expedition.

References

Mountains of King Edward VII Land